Statistics of American Soccer League II in season 1967–68.

Overview
For the 1967–68 season the league set up a two division system to work as a pro/reg tandem, with the First Division being the higher tier. Ultimately pro/reg wound up occurring only on paper because Hartford S.C withdrew after five games, and by season's end Boston, Baltimore, Newark Portuguese, Patterson Roma, and New Brunswick all folded.

Nearly all of the season was played in the later part of 1967, with a handful of make-up games and the playoffs scheduled for early 1968. Weather issues, a slate of regional cup and National Challenge Cup matches, friendlies against both NASL and international sides, and the apparent disorganization of the league itself conspired to continually reschedule those few remaining regular season matches until April. Individually, notching his 15th goal, Rochester's Nelson Bergamo overtook Ivan Paletta of Philadelphia's Ukrainian Nationals for the ASL scoring title in the Lancers' final match of the season on April 28. 

The finals were played more than a month later in late May and early June. Newspaper stories at the time indicate that because the Boston Tigers had already closed up shop, the league quickly adapted on the fly and matched First Division winners, Ukrainian Nationals of Philadelphia with Premier Division champions, New York Inter, instead playing semifinal matches, as was originally planned.
The Uke-Nats won the two-legged final, 8–4, on aggregate.

League standings

Championship final

First leg

Second leg

1969 ASL Champions: Ukrainian Nationals (8–4 aggregate)

References

American Soccer League II (RSSSF)

American Soccer League (1933–1983) seasons
2
2